Love Game, Love Games, or The Love Game may refer to:

Film, TV and theatre

Film
The Love Game (film), a 1960 French film
Love Game, 1995 Indian film
Love Games (film), a 2016 Indian film

Television
The Love Game (game show), 1984 Australian game show broadcast by Seven Network
Love Game (TV series), 2009 Japanese drama series
Love Games: Bad Girls Need Love Too, 2010 American reality TV series
"The Love Game" (Doctor Doctor), a 1990 episode of the American sitcom

Theatre
The Love Game, presented at New Arts Theatre, October 1964, starring British actress Jill Bennett

Music

Albums
Love Games, a 1975 album by The Drifters
Love Games (album), by Evan Rogers, 1985
Love Games, by Faze, 1991

Songs
 "Love Games" (Belle and the Devotions song), 1984
 "Love Game", a song by Eminem, from the album The Marshall Mathers LP 2 (2013)
 "Love Games" (Level 42 song), 1981
 "LoveGame", a song by Lady Gaga
 "Love Game", a song by Pure Energy
 "Love Game", a song by Tyga, from the album Careless World: Rise of the Last King (2012)
 "Love Games", a song by Strange Advance, 1983
 "The Love Game" (song), a 1975 song by John Paul Young
 "The Love Game", song by The Mudlarks, 1959

See also
This Game of Love, an album by Vic Damone 
The Game of Love (disambiguation)
For Love of the Game (disambiguation)